The Cape Government Railways 1st Class 4-4-0 of 1879 was a South African steam locomotive from the pre-Union era in the Cape of Good Hope.

In 1878, the Cape Government Railways placed orders with the Avonside Engine Company for four more 1st Class tender locomotives with a 4-4-0 American type wheel arrangement. They were intended for fast passenger service on the Western and Eastern Systems and were delivered in 1879. In 1880, eleven more of these locomotives followed from Neilson and Company.

Traffic growth
By 1878, increased traffic on the Western System of the Cape Government Railways (CGR) had given rise to a requirement for higher train speeds, which subjected most of the existing mainline locomotives with their small  diameter coupled wheels to rapid wear and resulted in the need for frequent heavy repairs. To meet the rising traffic requirements, orders were placed with Avonside Engine Company for more locomotives with larger diameter coupled wheels, in addition to the existing fleet of 1st Class 4-4-0 tank-and-optional-tender locomotives of 1875.

Manufacturers
In 1879, four 4-4-0 American type tender passenger locomotives were delivered to the CGR from Avonside Engine Company for fast passenger service out of Cape Town and East London respectively. They were equipped with  coupled wheels and six-wheeled tenders, numbered W25 and W26 for the Western System and E8 and E9 for the Eastern System. Their slide valves were actuated by Stephenson Link motion, while their boiler barrels were constructed in three sections, arranged telescopically.

In 1880, they were followed by another eleven locomotives. These were built by Neilson and Company and numbered in the ranges from W33 to W38 for the Western System and E10 to E14 for the Eastern System. This was the first CGR locomotive contract to be awarded to Neilson's.

Depicted is engine no. W35, when new, with the Western System officials who were responsible for the locomotive fleet on board, from left Workshop Foreman E.A. Goodwin, Locomotive Superintendent Michael Stephens and Steamshed Foreman McNamara.

Classification
When a locomotive classification system was later introduced by the CGR, all these locomotives were designated 1st Class. Although Espitalier and Day described them in 1943 as 2nd Class, the Classification of S.A.R. Engines with Renumbering Lists, a booklet which was issued by the Chief Mechanical Engineer's Office in January 1912, lists them as "4-4-0 1st class Avonside & Neilson".

Service

Cape Government Railways
As a result of the distances involved on the new mainlines which were being built into the arid Karoo, the CGR favoured tender locomotives over tank locomotives for mainline work from the outset, given the limited onboard coal and water capacities of tank engines. At the time these locomotives entered service in 1879, the two Eastern System lines from East London were open as far as King William's Town and approaching Queenstown respectively, while the Western System line from Montagu Road was approaching Beaufort West.

The Western line was officially opened to Beaufort West on 5 February 1880. At the time, it was the fastest long journey on record in South Africa.

South African Railways
When the Union of South Africa was established on 31 May 1910, the three Colonial government railways (CGR, Natal Government Railways and Central South African Railways) were united under a single administration to control and administer the railways, ports and harbours of the Union. Although the South African Railways and Harbours came into existence in 1910, the actual classification and renumbering of all the rolling stock of the three constituent railways was only implemented with effect from 1 January 1912.

In 1912, the nine surviving locomotives were considered obsolete by the SAR, designated Class 01 and renumbered by having the numeral 0 prefixed to their existing numbers. They were all withdrawn from service by 1915, after having completed a considerable mileage while serving on branchlines after being withdrawn from mainline work.

Renumbering
All these locomotives were renumbered at times during the CGR era. By 1886, all the system prefixes had been done away with and, of the Eastern System's locomotives, three were no longer on the books, while the remaining four had been renumbered in the range from 606 to 609. By 1890, the two Avonside locomotives of the Western System had also been renumbered. By 1910, three more locomotives were no longer on the books and in 1912 the nine remaining locomotives were renumbered with an 0 prefix by the SAR. The builders, works numbers, years in service, original numbers and renumbering of the Cape 1st Class of 1879 are listed in the table.

References

0200
4-4-0 locomotives
2′B n2 locomotives
Avonside locomotives
Neilson locomotives
Cape gauge railway locomotives
Railway locomotives introduced in 1879
1879 in South Africa
Scrapped locomotives